"K" Is for Killer is the 11th novel in Sue Grafton's "Alphabet" series of mystery novels and features Kinsey Millhone, a private eye based in Santa Teresa, California. The book had a initial printing of reportedly 600,000 copies and was a New York Times bestseller.  Vice cop Cheney Phillips is introduced in this novel.

Plot
Kinsey Millhone receives a visit from Janice Kepler whose beautiful but reclusive daughter, Lorna Kepler, died 10 months ago of an apparent allergic reaction. Someone has just sent Janice a tape of a pornographic movie Lorna made before her death, and Janice, who has never believed the official story of Lorna's death, wants Kinsey to find out the truth. Janice's husband, Mace, and her two surviving daughters, Berlyn and Trinny, seem less keen on the investigation.

With some help from Officer Cheney Phillips, Kinsey learns that Lorna, who was a receptionist at the water treatment plant by day, had accumulated a modest fortune as a high class prostitute by night. Kinsey finds herself abandoning her usual daytime routine in order to explore Lorna's world. Lorna's body was found by Serena Bonney, night-shift nurse and estranged wife of Lorna's boss at the water treatment plant, Roger Bonney. Serena's father, Clark Esselmann, is a powerful business tycoon and member of the local water board. Phillips introduces Kinsey to Danielle, a teenage colleague of Lorna's in her night-time occupation, who obliges Kinsey by giving her a badly needed haircut.

Kinsey has a terrifying Mafia-style encounter with a man describing himself as an attorney for a Los Angeles man to whom Lorna was engaged. He asks Kinsey to keep him abreast of any developments in the case.

Kinsey uncovers a variety of secrets: Berlyn found Lorna's body two days before Bonney, but kept quiet about in order to lift some of Lorna's money, and also sent her mother the porn video. Leda, the wife of Lorna's landlord, had placed recording equipment in Lorna's cabin because she was worried that Lorna was having an affair with her husband. After obtaining the tapes, Kinsey attends a meeting of the water board, where she witnesses a contentious debate between Esselman and his business rival John "Stubby" Stockton.

With the help of Lorna's friend, late-night radio DJ Hector Moreno, Kinsey transcribes the taped conversations, but can't make sense of them until Esselmann is electrocuted in his swimming pool. Kinsey realizes the conversation is someone telling Lorna the plot and surmises that Lorna was killed to keep her quiet. Her suspicions turn at first to Stubby Stockton, but then she realizes Roger Bonney had the necessary knowledge and access to his father-in-law's pool to have set up the electrocution. The final link in the chain is when Kinsey finds a photo of Lorna and Danielle with Stockton and Bonney.

Kinsey talks to Cheney Phillips about her suspicions of Bonney, but he points out there is no evidence. Frustrated that Bonney is likely to get away with murder, Kinsey phones the Mafia men and reports that Bonney is the killer. Overcome with guilt, she tries to warn Bonney, but he thinks she has come to confront him with the murder and stuns her with a taser. While Kinsey lies powerless on the floor, the Mafia types arrive and escort Bonney away, never to be seen again.

In the epilogue, Kinsey wonders if she can return from the "shadows" she has strayed into.

Characters
Kinsey Millhone: Private investigator

Development of the story
It was originally going to be titled "K" Is for Kidnap, until Sue Grafton's initial research revealed that kidnapping was a federal crime and realized that the FBI would never consult a small-time private investigator like Kinsey Millhone.

Reviews

Awards
"K" Is for Killer was awarded the 1995 Shamus Award for Best Novel from the Private Eye Writers of America and was nominated for the 1995 Anthony Award in the same category.

References

External links
Sue Grafton Alphabet Series official site

Novels by Sue Grafton
Kinsey Millhone novels
1994 American novels
Novels set in California
Shamus Award-winning works
Henry Holt and Company books